Kalvitsa is a rural locality (a selo) in Kuokuysky Rural Okrug of Kobyaysky District in the Sakha Republic, Russia, . Its population as of the 2002 Census was 177.

The village is named after the Finnish-born Soviet aviator and polar explorer Otto Kalvitsa.

Geography

References

Notes

Sources
Official website of the Sakha Republic. Registry of the Administrative-Territorial Divisions of the Sakha Republic. Kobyaysky District. 

Rural localities in Kobyaysky District